The Ness Foundation, established by Dr (later Professor) Iain Glen, a consultant psychiatrist, is a research charity based near Inverness, Scotland.  It was founded in the 1980s and previously known as The Highland Psychiatric Research Foundation, carrying out research into diagnosing conditions such as schizophrenia, bipolar disorder, autism spectrum disorder, developmental coordination disorder, dyslexia, depression and attention-deficit/hyperactivity disorder.  Its principal area of research has been the relevance of lipids in these disorders but recently this has been extended to include the role of genetics.

In 1999 the Ness Foundation became an associate partner in the University of the Highlands and Islands (UHI).  Between 2001 and 2004 the Foundation was run by Dr. Brian M. Ross during which time the Foundation received support from the European Regional Development Fund and various other private and public partners.  The ties between the University and the Ness Foundation grew closer with the Foundation contributing significantly to the total research output and income of UHI.

Through its wholly owned commercial subsidiary Pan Diagnostics Limited the Ness Foundation is working on a diagnostic tool kit consisting of a skin patch, breath test ( which measures how well your body breaks down Omega-3 fatty acid ) and a genetic test to enable early detection of serious mental illness.

As of 2008 the Office of the Scottish Charity Regulator records the Ness Foundation as being in liquidation.  The work of the Foundation was, however, absorbed into UHI where it continues to make progress.

External links
Ness Foundation Website 

Kit to help diagnosis of mental illness, David Ross, The Herald, May 2006
Making progress through a sticking point, article on the work of Iain Glen and the Ness Foundation, Jenny McBain, The Herald, June 2006

Health charities in Scotland
Mental health organisations in the United Kingdom
Research institutes in Scotland
Bipolar disorder researchers
1980s establishments in Scotland
Organisations based in Highland (council area)
Inverness
Psychiatric research institutes
2008 disestablishments in Scotland